The TCA Awards are awards presented by the Television Critics Association in recognition of excellence in television. There are eleven categories, which are presented every summer towards the end of the organization's summer press tour.

Due to the COVID-19 pandemic, the 2020 and 2021 awards were presented online.

Categories
TCA Awards are currently awarded in the following categories:
Program of the Year
Outstanding New Program
Individual Achievement in Drama
Individual Achievement in Comedy
Outstanding Achievement in Drama
Outstanding Achievement in Comedy
Outstanding Achievement in Movies, Miniseries, and Specials
Outstanding Achievement in News and Information
Outstanding Achievement in Reality Programming
Outstanding Achievement in Sketch/Variety Shows
Outstanding Achievement in Youth Programming
Career Achievement Award
Heritage Award

List of TCA Awards ceremonies

See also

 Canadian television awards

References

External links
 

 
American television awards
Canadian television awards
Awards established in 1984